Ammaa Ki Boli is an Indian Hindi language comedy drama film 
Directed by Narayan Chauhan 
and produced by Amaash Films, Next Entertainment and Street Act Productions.

Plot
The story revolves Rukmi who buys a scooter using his Mother's money, Later his brothers and nephew find out that he bought a scooter using Amma's money, his wife Pramila says to him to throw away Amma out of his house, Amma decides to live in Munna's house she remembers her young days and When she was living in Hari's house when she broke a cup, She dies in Munna's house, Her daughter Kalavati and daughter in law Tarla stole her jewellery, In Amma's funeral Hari blames the pandit that he stole the jewellery  and beats him

Cast
 Sanjay Mishra as Rukmi
 Hrishitaa Bhatt as Pramila
 Zakir Hussain as Hari
 Govind Namdev as Parmu
 Farrukh Jaffar as Amma
 Anupam Shyam as Tiwari Ji
Sitaram Panchal as Jeetu
Himani Shivpuri as Kalavati
Jugnu Ishiqui as Tarla
Ishqteyak Arif Khan as Munna
 Shravani Goswami as Bimla
 Nitu Pandey as young Amma
 Sheela Sharma as Kamla
 Sangeeta Tiwari as Sarla
 Shekhar Singh as Laxman
 Priya Patil as Urmila

References

External links 
 

2019 films
Indian romantic thriller films
2010s Hindi-language films
Hindi-language drama films